is a Japanese manga artist best known as the creator of Needless which has been adapted into a 24 episode anime television series by Madhouse.

Works
 Angoromoa-chan no Chikyū Shinryaku (2004, SoftBank Creative)
 Needless (2003-2013, serialized in Ultra Jump, Shueisha)
 Katatsumuri-chan (2006-2011, serialized in Manga Time Kirara, Houbunsha)
 Shirasunamura (2006-2013, serialized in Comic Rex, Ichijinsha)
 Infinite Dendrogram (2016-ongoing, serialized in Comic Fire)
 Magaimono (2019-ongoing, serialized in Young Magazine the 3rd)
 Outside works that appear in the ARCADIA magazine.

References

External links
 Official website 
 
 

Manga artists
Living people
1980 births